John Henderson (born 4 May 1973) is a Scottish darts player who plays in Professional Darts Corporation (PDC) events.

Career
Henderson started out in the PDC circuit and played one tournament in Scotland as well as the 2003 UK Open where he lost in the first round, having won his preliminary match. He then qualified for the 2005 BDO World Darts Championship, where he beat Stephen Bunting in the first round before losing in round two to Martin Adams – hitting a record thirteen 180s (for a five-set match) in the 3–2 defeat. Henderson then reached the quarter-finals of the 2005 British Open and the last 32 of the 2005 Winmau World Masters.

Henderson reached the final of the 2007 British Open. He beat Tony O'Shea in the quarter finals and Ted Hankey in the semis before losing to Gary Anderson in the final. This was followed however with failure to qualify for the 2008 BDO World Championship and an early exit from the 2007 World Masters.

2008–2009
2008 was a good year for Henderson, reaching the semi-finals of the Norway Open and the quarter finals of the WDF Europe Cup. On 20 September 2008 Henderson captured his very first title, winning the 2008 British Open. He scored notable wins over Edwin Max and Dave Chisnall to earn a spot into the televised stages which were shown live on Setanta Sports. He then defeated Gary Robson in the quarter-finals and Mareno Michels in the semis before avenging his defeat over Anderson twelve months previously by beating him in the final to win the £3,000 top prize. The win also helped Henderson finish fourth in the BDO International Grand Prix, earning him another £2,750 for his efforts. He also shot up the world rankings as a result of the win, moving him into the WDF's top 20. He then captured the German Open in 2009, beating Stephen Bunting in the final which elevated Henderson to seven in the WDF rankings.

2010–2011
Henderson then qualified for the 2010 BDO World Championship, winning one of four places available from the Inter-Playoff Qualifiers in Bridlington. He was defeated in the second round by Scott Waites. Henderson failed to qualify for the 2011 tournament, but did qualify for the 2010 Grand Slam of Darts where he finished third in his group. After being defeated by Mervyn King he was accused of standing in front of the oche, however after watching the match again, King admitted that he had over-reacted and apologised to Henderson in a pre-match interview.

On 15 January 2011, Henderson came through qualifying at the PDC Q-School event and has therefore left the British Darts Organisation. On joining the PDC he said "It means everything to me the first two days were hard and I felt a lot of pressure today but to qualify, so I'm delighted I did it."

In the 2011 Derby championships, Henderson hit a nine-darter in his second leg of the second round beating Andy Hamilton 6–5 and earning £800.

Henderson qualified for the 2011 World Matchplay where he beat Colin Lloyd 10–7 in the first round, before losing to Andy Hamilton 13–11 in the second round. He defeated on form Justin Pipe 2–0 at the World Grand Prix 2011, he went on to reach the Quarter finals losing to eventual runner up Brendan Dolan

2012 - 2020 
Henderson reached his first PDC World Championship in 2012, but was beaten by three-time World Champion, John Part, 0–3. He only managed to win 2 legs during the match, with Part stating afterwards that "John struggled and wasn't himself". His best result on the 2012 Pro Tour was in reaching the quarter-finals of the 16th Players Championship event, where he lost to Nick Fullwell 2–6. Henderson was beaten in the last 16 of the Qualifier for the 2013 World Championship. He was ranked world number 39 after the World Championship.

Henderson qualified for the 2013 UK Open by finishing 50th on the Order of Merit to enter the event in the second round. He enjoyed his best ever run in the tournament by beating Dave Place, Scott Rand and Kevin McDine to advance to the last 16. He played James Wade and lost 9–4. Henderson reached the quarter-finals of a Players Championship played in Killarney for the second consecutive year as he beat Mark Webster, Ian White and Justin Pipe before being whitewashed 6–0 by Darren Webster. He qualified for the 2014 World Championship through the ProTour Order of Merit having claimed the ninth of sixteen places that were available to non-qualified players. Henderson started his first round match brightly as he took a 2–0 lead against seventh seed Dave Chisnall which included a 132 finish of bull, bull, double 16. He threw for the match in the third set but lost the leg and the set as Chisnall fought back to level the game. Henderson survived four match darts from Chisnall in the final set as he pulled off a big shock win in a performance he rated as the best of his career. Another tight match followed against Mark Webster with Henderson missing three darts at tops to seal a 4–2 win, and then went on to lose the deciding set to bow out of the tournament 4–3.

At the 2014 UK Open, Henderson was beaten 5–1 by Jelle Klaasen in the second round. He beat Steve Hine 6–4, Peter Wright 6–5 and Simon Whitlock 6–2 (with an average of 106.12) to reach the quarter-finals of the German Darts Masters, where he lost 6–2 against Adrian Lewis. In the rest of the year he lost in the last 16 of two Players Championships and qualified for three European Tour events, losing in the second round in two and the opening round of the other.

The opening four sets in Henderson's first round 2015 World Championship match against Vincent van der Voort went with throw to send it into a deciding set. Van der Voort hit a crucial 157 finish with Henderson waiting on 80 for the match and from there the Dutchman won back-to-back 14 dart legs to knock him out. A pair of last 16 finishes helped Henderson enter the UK Open at the third round stage and he eliminated Steve Douglas 9–7 and then retained his composure when Daryl Gurney won five legs in a row to lead 8–7 by beating him 9–8. This matched Henderson's best ever run the event, but it came to a sudden end when he lost 9–2 against Peter Wright. At the German Darts Masters, Henderson defeated Michael Smith 6–4 and then averaged 102.48 in a 6–0 whitewash over Andrew Gilding. He improved upon that in the quarter-finals by averaging 107.72 during a 6–1 victory against Brendan Dolan and knocked out Adrian Lewis 6–4 to reach his first PDC final. Henderson played world number one Michael van Gerwen and he sent the match into a final leg decider, after being 3–0 down, which he lost without getting a dart for the title. He suffered first round exits at the World Matchplay (10–2 to Phil Taylor) and the World Grand Prix (2–0 in sets to Gary Anderson), but then defeated Robert Thornton 6–4 at the European Championship. Henderson then took advantage of a poor performance from Rowby-John Rodriguez in the second round to thrash him 10–2 and reach his first major quarter-final in over four years, where he lost 10–4 to Peter Wright.

After taking the opening set in his first round match at the 2016 World Championship, Henderson went on to lose 3–1 against Darren Webster. One semi-final and a quarter-final appearance in the qualifiers helped him finish 17th on the Order of Merit for the UK Open. Henderson saw off Magnus Caris 9–4, before losing 9–6 to Adrian Lewis in the fourth round. His second semi-final of the year was at the 14th Players Championship event and he was knocked out 6–4 by Michael van Gerwen. He was ousted 6–3 by Gary Anderson in the first round of the Players Championship Finals.

He won the opening two sets against Andrew Gilding in the first round of the 2017 World Championship, before it was levelled at 2–2. Henderson missed one match dart in the deciding set and it would eventually go to a sudden-death leg. Gilding won the bull to throw first and took the leg to eliminate Henderson.

Following Gary Anderson's withdrawal from the 2019 Premier League, Henderson was selected as one of nine 'contenders' to replace him. A great boost for his Red Army following of his fellow Aberdeen FC fans. He played a one-off match against No. 1 PDC-ranked Michael van Gerwen on night five in Aberdeen. The match resulted in a draw.

Henderson returned to the Premier League in 2020 under the new tag of 'Challenger', once again in Aberdeen. However, he was beaten by Nathan Aspinall.

2021 
Henderson, alongside Peter Wright, won the 2021 PDC World Cup of Darts playing on behalf of Scotland. 

It is his first PDC Major Tournament win.

Personal life 
Henderson is married to Veronica Hughes and has no children.

World Championship results

BDO

2005: Second round (lost to Martin Adams 2–3)
2010: Second round (lost to Scott Waites 1–4)

PDC

2012: First round (lost to John Part 0–3)
2014: Second round (lost to Mark Webster 3–4)
2015: First round (lost to Vincent van der Voort 2–3)
2016: First round (lost to Darren Webster 1–3)
2017: First round (lost to Andrew Gilding 2–3)
2018: Third round (lost to Rob Cross 1–4)
2019: Third round (lost to Michael Smith 2–4)
2020: Third round (lost to Gerwyn Price 0–4)
2021: Second round (lost to Jonny Clayton 1–3)

Career finals

PDC European tour finals: (1 runner-up)

PDC team finals: 1 (1 title)

Performance timeline

References

External links

Profile on modusdarts.tv

1973 births
Living people
Scottish darts players
People from Huntly
Professional Darts Corporation former tour card holders
British Darts Organisation players
Sportspeople from Aberdeenshire
PDC World Cup of Darts Scottish championship team